Aphrodisias is a Central American genus of planthoppers in the family Fulgoridae.

Species
 Aphrodisias cacica Stål, 1869: type species
 Aphrodisias shaman O'Brien, 1991

References

External links

FLOW: Aphrodisias

Fulgorinae
Auchenorrhyncha genera